Yoncalı is a village in the central district of Hakkâri Province in Turkey. The village is populated by Kurds of a non-tribal background and had a population of 13 in 2022.

History 
The non-tribal Kurdish population residing in Yoncalı migrated from neighboring Kavaklı.

Population 
Population history from 2013 to 2022:

References 

Villages in Hakkâri District
Kurdish settlements in Hakkâri Province